The Secret of the Scaffold (German: Das Geheimnis des Schafotts) is a 1919 German silent historical drama film directed by Eugen Burg.

The film's sets were designed by the art director Mathieu Oostermann.

Main cast
 Eugen Burg
 Oskar Marion
 Wanda Treumann

References

External links

1919 films
Films of the Weimar Republic
German silent feature films
Films directed by Eugen Burg
German crime drama films
1919 crime drama films
German black-and-white films
Films based on short fiction
German historical drama films
1910s historical drama films
Silent drama films
1910s German films
Adaptations of works by Auguste Villiers de l'Isle-Adam